The 2017 German motorcycle Grand Prix was the ninth round of the 2017 MotoGP season. It was held at the Sachsenring in Hohenstein-Ernstthal on 2 July 2017.

Classification

MotoGP

 Héctor Barberá was disqualified for ignoring a jump start ride-through penalty.

Moto2

 Axel Pons crashed during Sunday morning warm-up session and was ruled out of the race.
 Luca Marini withdrew from the event citing left shoulder pain which he originally sustained in a crash during French GP.

Moto3

 Jorge Martín suffered a broken ankle in a crash during free practice and withdrew from the event.

Championship standings after the race

MotoGP
Below are the standings for the top five riders and constructors after round nine has concluded.

Riders' Championship standings

Constructors' Championship standings

 Note: Only the top five positions are included for both sets of standings.

Moto2

Moto3

Notes

References

German
Motorcycle Grand Prix
German motorcycle Grand Prix
German
German